Stuart Warren Cramer (March 31, 1868 – July 2, 1940) was an American engineer, inventor, and contractor, who gained prominence after designing and building near 150 cotton mills in the southern United States. He was the founder of Cramerton and became involved in the nascent air conditioning industry, as well as being a founding partner in Duke Power.

Biography
He was born in Thomasville, North Carolina to Mary Jane Thomas Cramer and John Thomas, a furniture manufacturer. He graduated from the United States Naval Academy in 1888 after studying naval engineering. Cramer chose to resign from the Navy to study in the School of Mines at Columbia University in 1888–1889. He found employment with the U.S. Mint in Charlotte, where he worked for four years. After that he worked for Daniel A. Tompkins, an engineer and industrialist, for two years, and then went into business for himself designing and equipping cotton mills in the South.

In a May 1906 speech in Asheville, North Carolina, before the American Cotton Manufacturers Association, Cramer coined the term air conditioning. Cramer's connection to air conditioning originated from his work in the textile industry. Over the course of his career he acquired more than 60 patents for the humidity control and ventilating equipment he developed for cotton mills across the South.

Cramer was a founding member of the American Cotton Manufacturers Association and the National Council of American Cotton Textile Manufacturers.

He died in Charlotte, North Carolina on 4 July 1940 an was buried in Elmwood Cemetery.

His great-grandson is actor Grant Cramer.

Recognition
Stuart W. Cramer High School in Cramerton, North Carolina which includes Cramerton in its attendance district, was named for him.

Several of his textile works are listed on the U.S. National Register of Historic Places.

Works include:
 Highland Park Manufacturing Company Mill No. 3, 2901 N. Davidson St., Charlotte, North Carolina (Cramer, Stuart Warren), NRHP-listed 
Mayworth School, 236 Eighth Ave., Cramerton, North Carolina (Cramer, Stuart), NRHP-listed
One or more works in North Charlotte Historic District, roughly bounded by the Southern Railroad, Herrin St., Spencer St., and Charles Ave., Charlotte, North Carolina (Cramer, Stuart), NRHP-listed

References

Further reading
 Useful information for cotton manufacturers, by Cramer, Stuart Warren. Charlotte, N.C. : Queen City Printing and Paper Co., 1904.

External links
 Stuart W. Cramer, Textile History
 Cramer, Stuart W. (1868-1940), The North Carolina State University Libraries

1868 births
1940 deaths
American engineers
Architects from North Carolina
People from Gaston County, North Carolina